John Purnell Chatham (July 2, 1872 – October 3, 1914) was an American sailor serving in the United States Navy during Boxer Rebellion who received the Medal of Honor for bravery.

Biography
Chatham was born July 2, 1872, in Worcester County, Maryland and after entering the US Navy, Chatham was sent to China to fight in the Boxer Rebellion. He died October 3, 1914, and is buried in Parsons Cemetery in Salisbury, Maryland.

Medal of Honor citation
Rank and organization: Gunner's Mate Second Class, U.S. Navy
Born: 2 July 1872, Worcester County, Md
Accredited to: Maryland
G.O. No.: 55, 19 July 1901

Citation:
 In action with the relief expedition of the Allied Forces in China, 13, 20, 21 and 22 June 1900. During this period and in the presence of the enemy, Chatham distinguished himself by his conduct.

See also

List of Medal of Honor recipients
List of Medal of Honor recipients for the Boxer Rebellion

References
Inline

General

1872 births
1914 deaths
United States Navy Medal of Honor recipients
United States Navy sailors
People from Worcester County, Maryland
American military personnel of the Boxer Rebellion
Boxer Rebellion recipients of the Medal of Honor